Nicole L. M. Hoevertsz   (born 30 May 1964) is a former synchronized swimmer from Aruba (formerly part of the Netherlands Antilles). She competed in the women's duet competitions.

Nicole has been a member of the International Olympic Committee since 2006 and is currently a member of the IOC Executive Board. In July 2021 she was elected as the Vice-President of the IOC.

References 

1964 births
Living people
Aruban female swimmers
Aruban synchronized swimmers
International Olympic Committee members
Leiden University alumni
Olympic synchronized swimmers of the Netherlands Antilles
Synchronized swimmers at the 1984 Summer Olympics